Ocean Beach was an amusement park in Rhyl, North Wales which operated from 1954 until 2 September 2007.

History
Rhyl began to take off as holiday resort following the opening of its train station in 1848. The Ocean Beach funfair opened in the 1890s, growing into an amusement park at Marine Lake which was seeing thousands of visitors annually. It relocated in 1954 to larger premises at the West end of the promenade. The first British tubular steel rollercoaster was built at Ocean Beach.

Demise
The town and the park declined in popularity since the 1960s and there had been very little investment in new rides or attractions in its final years. It closed for the final time on 2 September 2007. Plans to build a retail, leisure and housing complex on the site of the old Ocean Beach site, known as Ocean Plaza, was due to commence in May 2009 but were delayed and ultimately scrapped. As of 2015, plans for the site (now downsized and to be a retail-only park called Marina Quay) were approved, and stores began to open there in stages from 2017.

Accidents
An accident on 31 July 2005 with five injuries, none serious, was reported as the "first accident in 40 years", suggesting the park had a very good safety record.

Notable past rides

Video footage
Some video footage from the defunct rides does exist on YouTube
Jetstream video
Pepsi Cola Loop
Log Ride

References

External links
Rollercoaster database List of attractions
Demolition footage YouTube
Pictures of the last days of Ocean Beach
Article about Ocean Beach in the 1960s & 1970s
Article about Ocean Beach in the 1970s & 1980s

1954 establishments in Wales
2007 disestablishments in Wales
Rhyl
Defunct amusement parks in the United Kingdom
Amusement parks opened in 1954
Amusement parks closed in 2007